Karlie Elizabeth Kloss (born August 3, 1992) is an American fashion model. Vogue Paris declared her one of the "top 30 models of the 2000s" when she was 17.
Kloss was a Victoria's Secret Angel from 2013 until 2015; she resigned to study at New York University. Models.com has said that Kloss "represents the gold standard of modeling—a girl with the look, the poise, and the drive to take things to the next level", and she ranks on their "New Supers" and "Money Girl" lists. By 2019, she had appeared on 40 international Vogue covers.

Outside of modeling, Kloss has an interest in technology and has founded the "Kode with Klossy" camp, which aims to get young girls interested in STEM fields. In 2019, Kloss became the host of the reality competition television series Project Runway. She has signed with several top modeling agencies throughout her career including Elite Model Management, Next Management, IMG Models, and The Society Management.

Early life and education
Kloss was born on August 3, 1992, in Chicago, Illinois, to Tracy, a freelance director, and Kurt Kloss, an emergency physician. Her family has German, Danish, and Polish ancestry. She has three sisters; two younger sisters Kimberly and Kariann (twins), and one older sister Kristine. She moved to St. Louis with her family in 1994. In 2013, the family moved to Goshen, New York to support her modeling career. Kloss has called her classical ballet training "a beautiful thing" that taught her how to move in the modeling world and was a great training ground for her runway walk.

In 2011, Kloss graduated from Webster Groves High School in Webster Groves, Missouri, where she was a cheerleader. In September 2015, Kloss enrolled in the Gallatin School of Individualized Study of New York University.

Career

2006–2010: Beginnings and modeling breakthrough
Kloss was discovered at a local benefit runway show. In 2006, at the age of 14, Kloss posed for a cover and editorial shoot for the June issue of Scene Magazine in Chicago with photographer David Leslie Anthony, in an editorial spread titled "Almost Famous". Elite Model Management Chicago then forwarded these tear sheets to Elite Model Management's New York office, who signed her.

Her first credited modeling shoot was photographed by Arthur Elgort for Teen Vogue. One of her first modeling stints was for Abercrombie Kids when she posed for the brand's photography shot by Bruce Weber. In January 2008, she left Elite Model Management and signed with Next Management. She walked 31 runways in New York Fashion Week, notably walking as an exclusive for Calvin Klein, closing for Marc Jacobs, opening Carolina Herrera, and occupying both spots at Doo.Ri. After New York, she walked 20 shows in Milan, and 13 in Paris for the fall 2008 collections, with 64 shows in a single season.

Kloss found herself in the middle of a legal dispute when her former agency, Elite Model Management, sued Next Management for allegedly stealing its star by offering her "improper compensation" to sign; Elite Model Management felt they were responsible for launching her career. The case was eventually settled out of court. After four years of being represented by Next Management, Kloss signed with IMG Models (also leaving Mother Model Management in St. Louis).

She has been in advertisements for Rebecca Taylor, Jean Paul Gaultier, Donna Karan, Nina Ricci, Chloé, Lacoste, Sportmax, Alexander McQueen, Yves Saint Laurent, Elie Saab, Dolce & Gabbana, Gap, Bally Shoe, Bergdorf Goodman, Pringle of Scotland, Dior, Hermès, Oscar de la Renta, Sonia Rykiel, Aquascutum, Topshop, Eryn Brinie, Uniqlo, Omnia Jade, Lord & Taylor, Barneys New York, American Eagle, Victoria's Secret PINK, and Adidas. Kloss is the face of the Marc Jacobs fragrance Lola. She has walked for numerous designers in New York, London, Milan, and Paris, including Shiatzy Chen, Calvin Klein, Karl Lagerfeld, Marc Jacobs, Zac Posen, Givenchy, Gucci, Valentino, Louis Vuitton, Versace, and Elie Saab.

Kloss has appeared in editorials for American and Korean W, American Elle, Allure, i-D, French and Japanese Numéro, Vanity Fair, Dazed & Confused; and American, Australian, Italian, French, British, Korean, German, Japanese, Chinese, Turkish, Portuguese, Teen, and Latin American editions of Vogue magazine. She notably appeared on 12 international Vogue covers, including Vogue Italia, in a five-year span. She appeared on the cover of Teen Vogue, alongside Chanel Iman and Ali Michael in February 2008, and by herself in May 2010.

She made her first venture into television when she appeared in the Gossip Girl episode "Belles de Jour" as herself. She became a muse for fashion designer John Galliano, and has appeared in Dior and John Galliano campaigns. She opened both shows, Christian Dior Haute Couture and Dior resort for spring/summer 2010. In the spring/summer 2011 season, she opened ten shows and closed eight.

2011–present: Recognition and success
Her runway walk, one of the most unusual, is often described as powerful. Kloss's height, long legs, and precise placement of one foot perfectly in front of the other in fluid motion distinguish her catwalk stride, usually garnished with a serious, sultry expression. Kloss has described her runway walk a "moody gait".

In 2011, Kloss renewed her contract with Christian Dior for the third season in a row. Photographer Gabrielle Revere was commissioned by Life magazine to photograph Karlie Kloss for the cover of a special print issue handed out during New York Fashion Week in September 2011. The photo story inside the issue was photographed during the summer of 2011, and shows her at the couture shows in Paris, in New York City, and in Saint Louis, her hometown. The same year, she made her debut in the Victoria's Secret Fashion Show.

In 2012, Kloss was featured on the September covers of British Vogue, Japanese Vogue, Harper's Bazaar Russia, and Numéro. She appeared in the campaign ads of Juicy Couture, Stefanel, Elie Saab, and Jean Paul Gaultier. She co-hosted the revival of the MTV series House of Style with fellow model Joan Smalls. She also appeared in that year's Victoria's Secret Fashion Show, but one of her outfits was cut out of the broadcast after appearing in a Native American headdress that was deemed offensive. Just before the Victoria's Secret Fashion in 2012, Kloss cut her long hair into a bob which is famously called the "Karlie".

In 2013, Kloss was the face of Donna Karan, Lacoste, and Lanvin campaigns. Kloss worked with Victoria's Secret on their 2013 summer swimwear video. She was also the red carpet host of the 2013 MTV Movie Awards pre-show. In April, Kloss starred alongside Daria Strokous, Monika Jagaciak, and Iris Strubegger in Louis Vuitton's Alma bag campaign. In 2013, Kloss was named as one of the new ambassadors for Coach, Inc. and starred in the accessory maker's fall 2013 campaign.

In 2014, Kloss was the face of Jean Paul Gaultier, Nike, Donna Karan, Lancaster, and the Chanel Coco Noir fragrance campaigns. She also collaborated with Frame Denim to design the Forever Karlie jeans collection. In summer 2014, Kloss worked with Warby Parker to design the Karlie Kloss x Warby Parker eyewear line, proceeds of which benefited Edible Schoolyard NYC. In September 2014, after many speculations, L'Oreal Paris officially announced that they have signed Kloss to be the newest face. In the September 2014 issue of American Vogue, she was featured on the cover with Joan Smalls, Cara Delevingne, Arizona Muse, Edie Campbell, Imaan Hammam, Fei Fei Sun, Vanessa Axente, and Andreea Diaconu as "The Instagirls!"

In 2015, Kloss covered the March issue of American Vogue with her close friend Taylor Swift. Kloss portrayed the role of "Knockout" in the music video for Swift's song "Bad Blood" which premiered at the 2015 Billboard Music Awards. Kloss appeared in several video segments during Taylor Swift's 1989 World Tour and appeared live on stage with Swift at the performance of June 27, 2015 at London's Hyde Park, as well as on July 11, 2015, at the MetLife Stadium in East Rutherford, New Jersey. Kloss also starred in the music video for Chic's "I'll Be There", which was directed by Inez van Lamsweerde and Vinoodh Matadin. On July 21, 2015, Kloss started her own YouTube channel, Klossy, which features weekly vlogs and Q&A videos. Kloss is a close friend of filmmaker Casey Neistat, who assisted her in starting up on YouTube.

In May 2016, Kloss was named the new face of Swarovski, replacing fellow Victoria's Secret alumna Miranda Kerr, for a two-year contract.

In April 2017, she appeared as a correspondent on the Netflix series Bill Nye Saves the World. Kloss was featured in Vogue's March 2017 issue. The spread was criticized by some as a form of cultural appropriation as she appeared styled as a geisha. She later posted a public apology. In Fall 2017, Kloss announced her TV show, Movie Night with Karlie Kloss, airing on Freeform in winter 2017. On May 24, 2017 Kloss won the Diane von Furstenberg Inspiration Award.

In April 2018, Kloss was announced as Estée Lauder's newest Global spokesmodel and Brand Ambassador. The company is committed to supporting her initiative "Kode with Klossy" through scholarships and events. In October 2018, Kloss confirmed that she would be stepping in Heidi Klum's shoes on the seventeenth season of Project Runway as the host and executive producer: "I could not be more excited to host and produce a series that provides a platform to aspiring American designers as they pursue their creative and entrepreneurial dreams."

In October 2019, Kloss narrated the season 2 episode "Coding" on the Netflix and Vox Media television show Explained.

Other ventures 
Kloss is also a computer programmer, having studied Ruby on Rails and other web development technologies at the Flatiron School in 2014.

In April 2015, Kloss began partnering with Flatiron School and Code.org to offer an annual scholarship called Kode with Klossy for young girls interested in computer science and software engineering. In 2015, she also launched the Kode with Klossy two-week summer coding camp for girls from ages 13–18. As of 2018, the camp had expanded to include "50 coding camps in 25 US cities, teaching 1,000 girls to code". The camp teaches the basics of numerous programming languages, such as Ruby, JavaScript, and Swift. By the end of the program, participants in the camp had built fully functional mobile apps or websites.

In collaboration with Momofuku Milk Bar, Kloss created a special recipe called Karlie's Kookies sold in DKNY Soho during Fashion's Night Out in New York City, with proceeds benefiting hungry children around the world (through FEED Projects). Kloss called it a "Perfect 10 Kookie" because for every tin of cookies sold, 10 meals were donated to starving children all over the world.

Kloss is an investor, with the Daily Front Row reporting in 2020 that Kloss was one of a group of high profile investors who purchased the fashion magazine W. She is also an investor in probiotic company Seed.

In 2020, she was named a trustee of Barnard College for a term of four years.

Personal life
Kloss began dating businessman and investor Joshua Kushner in 2012. On July 24, 2018, Kloss announced her engagement to Kushner, one month after she converted to Judaism (Kushner's religion). The couple married on October 18, 2018, in upstate New York. In June 2019, Kloss and Kushner had a second wedding celebration in Wyoming.

Through her marriage, she is related to Kushner's brother Jared and his wife Ivanka Trump, who are members of the family of Donald Trump. She has stated that she finds it "frustrating [...] that the spotlight is always shifted away from [her] career toward [her] relationship". In October 2020, it was reported that Kloss and Kushner are expecting their first child. In December 2020, the couple purchased a home in Miami, Florida for US$23.5 million. Their first child was born in March 2021. She supported Hillary Clinton in the 2016 United States presidential election.

In March 2018, both Kloss and her husband attended the March for Our Lives event in Washington, D.C. in protest of gun violence in the United States. She is a feminist, and has stated that her decision to leave Victoria's Secret was partly motivated by her beliefs. Kloss supported Joe Biden in the 2020 United States presidential election.

See also
Kushner family

References

Notes

Further reading

External links

 
 
 
 

1992 births
Living people
American ballerinas
American child models
American people of Danish descent
American people of German descent
American people of Polish descent
American YouTubers
American female models
Converts to Judaism
Female models from Illinois
People from Webster Groves, Missouri
Webster Groves High School alumni
New York University Gallatin School of Individualized Study alumni
Jewish female models
21st-century American Jews
Kushner family
Businesspeople from St. Louis
Businesspeople from Chicago
Victoria's Secret Angels
Models from Chicago
21st-century American businesswomen
21st-century American businesspeople
Missouri Democrats
American feminists
Jewish feminists
The Society Management models
New York (state) Democrats